The Manara Clock Tower or al-Manura clock tower is a clock tower located in the middle of the central square (casbah) in the Old City of Nablus next to the An-Nasr Mosque in the Palestinian territories. 

Five stories high, it was erected in 1906 on the orders of the Ottoman sultan Abdul Hamid II to celebrate 30 years of his reign. The tower is similar to those also built by Sultan Abdul Hamid in Tripoli (today in Lebanon) and Jaffa. The Manara Clock Tower has an ode to the sultan in elaborate Arabic calligraphy. 

The Manara Clock Tower is currently the symbol of the Municipality of Nablus, established as such after the Palestinian political party Hamas won the 2006 local elections in that city.

References

Bibliography
 

Towers completed in 1906
Clock towers
Buildings and structures in Nablus
Architecture in the State of Palestine
Ottoman clock towers
1906 establishments in the Ottoman Empire